= Shelleyan =

Shelleyan is an eponymous adjective that may refer to:

- Percy Bysshe Shelley (1792–1822), English Romantic poet
- Mary Shelley (1797-1851), English novelist and author of Frankenstein
